Gentleman of the Chapel Royal is the office of an adult male singer of the Chapel Royal, the household choir of the monarchs of England.

Notable holders

15th century 
 Gilbert Banester
 Robert Fayrfax
 William Newark

16th century 
 John Bull
 William Byrd
 Thomas Causton
 Richard Edwardes
 Richard Farrant
 Edmund Hooper
 William Hunnis
 William Mundy
 Thomas Palfreyman
 Robert Parsons
 John Sheppard
 Robert Stone
 Thomas Tallis

17th century 
 Ralph Amner
 Elway Bevin
 John Blow
 William Child
 Henry Cooke
 Christopher Gibbons
 Orlando Gibbons
 John Gostling
 William Heather
 Pelham Humfrey
 Robert Jones
 Henry Lawes
 John Lenton
 Matthew Locke
 Francis Pigott
 Henry Purcell
 Thomas Day
 Thomas Tomkins
 William Turner
 Michael Wise

18th century 
 Edmund Ayrton
 Richard Bellamy
 William Croft
 Richard Elford
 Luke Flintoft
 John Sale
 William Savage
 John Stafford Smith
 John Weldon

19th century 
 William Beale
 William Hayman Cummings
 Charles Smart Evans
 William Hawes
 William Knyvett
 Edward Lloyd
 Henry Wylde Sr

20th century 
 James Bowman

References

Notes 

Positions within the British Royal Household
Gentlemen of the Chapel Royal
English male singers